Sleeping Turtles Preserve (known locally as two separate entities as Sleeping Turtles Preserve North and Sleeping Turtles Preserve South) includes  of land in Sarasota County, Florida, that were purchased in four parcels during 2003 and 2004 through the Environmentally Sensitive Lands Protection Program (ESLPP). The preserve is separated by Interstate 75 which runs east-west. Access to the northern preserve is located at 3462 Border Road in Venice and the southern preserve is located at 2800 River Road.

History
The name "Sleeping Turtles" comes from descriptions on naval maps from the 1800s of the Myakka River. The park includes floodplain swamps, pine flatwoods, upland mixed forests and seasonal wetlands; habitats for gopher tortoises, swallow-tailed kites, alligators and song birds. The southern preserve has a canoe and kayak launch on the Myakka River.

References

Reptile conservation organizations
Protected areas of Sarasota County, Florida